Derek Jeter Pro Baseball 2008 (full title: Derek Jeter Pro Baseball 2008 3D) is the fourth in a series of baseball video games developed and published by Gameloft for mobile phones. It was released on March 8, 2008.

The game can be run in full 3D on wireless phones that can handle the graphic upgrade, and features a 58-game season, with playoffs and league stats included, as well as baseball tips offered by Jeter mid-game. The game also features an advanced Difficult level.

Note
The first wireless baseball game to include the catcher.

External links
Official site
Official press release
IGN profile page

2008 video games
Baseball video games
Mobile games
North America-exclusive video games
Video games developed in France
Gameloft games
Jeter
Jeter
Video games based on real people